Kennecott Land, a subsidiary of Rio Tinto Group, is an American land development company formed in 2001 and based in South Jordan, Utah in the United States. Kennecott Land owns 93,000 acres (380 km²) of undeveloped land in Salt Lake and Tooele counties in Utah, 75,000 acres (300 km²) of which are located in Salt Lake County. The company was formed by Rio Tinto in order to utilize land formerly owned by mining companies like Kennecott Utah Copper.

The first major development, the Daybreak Community, has begun construction in the western half of the city of South Jordan. It is an environmentally friendly, high-tech community centered on the  artificial Oquirrh Lake. It will feature 20,000 residential units by the year 2020 and could double the population of South Jordan.

External links
Deseret News article on proposed west bench development
Deseret News article on detailed west bench plan

Companies based in Utah
Companies based in Salt Lake County, Utah
Rio Tinto (corporation) subsidiaries
Real estate companies established in 2001
2001 establishments in Utah
South Jordan, Utah